Martín Fernández de Angulo Saavedra y Luna (died 21 June 1516) was a Roman Catholic prelate who served as Bishop of Córdoba (1510–1516) and Bishop of Cartagena (1508–1510).

Biography
On 22 December 1508, Martín Fernández de Angulo Saavedra y Luna was selected by the King of Spain and confirmed by Pope Julius II as Bishop of Cartagena. On 30 September 1510, he was selected by the King of Spain and confirmed by Pope Julius II as Bishop of Córdoba. He served as Bishop of Córdoba until his death on 21 June 1516.

References

External links and additional sources
 (for Chronology of Bishops) 
 (for Chronology of Bishops) 
 (for Chronology of Bishops) 
 (for Chronology of Bishops) 

1516 deaths
16th-century Roman Catholic bishops in Spain
Bishops appointed by Pope Julius II